The following is a list of princesses of Antioch.

Princess consort of Antioch

House of Hauteville, 1098–1163

House of Poitiers, 1163–1268

Titular Princess consort of Antioch

House of Poitiers, 1268–1299

House of Toucy, 1299–1300

House of Lusignan, 1300–1457
Although the ultimate heirs to the Principality of Antioch was the Kings, later Titular King, of Cyprus, they didn't use the title of Prince of Antioch nor their wife Princess of Antioch; it was only given to a few heirs to the Cypriot throne and a potential jure uxoris king.

See also
List of Queens of Jerusalem
List of Cypriot consorts
List of Armenian consorts
List of Latin empresses

Notes

Sources
ANTIOCH

Antioch